New Providence is an island in the Bahamas.

New Providence may also refer to:
New Providence, Iowa
New Providence, New Jersey
New Providence, Pennsylvania, a community
New Providence (horse)

See also
 Providence (disambiguation)